, born , was the twelfth child and eighth daughter of Emperor Meiji of Japan, and the fifth child and fourth daughter of Sono Sachiko, the Emperor's fifth concubine.

Biography
Nobuko was born in Japan, the daughter of Emperor Meiji and Lady Sachiko. She held the childhood appellation "Fumi no miya" (Princess Fumi).

Her future husband, Prince Yasuhiko Asaka, was the eighth son of Prince Asahiko Kuni and the court lady Sugako Tsunoda. Prince Yasuhiko was also a half-brother of Prince Naruhiko Higashikuni, Prince Morimasa Nashimoto, Prince Kuninori Kaya, and Prince Kuniyoshi Kuni, the father of the future Empress Kōjun, the consort of Emperor Shōwa. On 10 March 1906, Emperor Meiji granted Prince Yasuhiko the title Asaka-no-miya and authorization to begin a new branch of the imperial family. On 6 May 1909, Prince Asaka married Princess Fumi. Prince and Princess Asaka had four children:

 ; married Marquis Nabeshima Naoyasu in 1931. Last grandchild of Emperor Meiji to have been born during his lifetime.
 ; married Todo Chikako, the fifth daughter of Count Todo Takatsugu. They had two daughters, Fukuko and Minoko and a son Tomohiko.
 , renounced membership in the imperial family and created Marquis Otowa, 1936. Killed in action during the Battle of Kwajalein);
 ; married Count Ogyu Yoshiatsu, died 1 day before her 100th birthday. She was the last surviving grandchild of Emperor Meiji.

Nobuko died on 3 November 1933, aged 42, due to kidney disease.

Honours
 Grand Cordon of the Order of the Precious Crown

Ancestry

References 

1891 births
1933 deaths
Japanese princesses

Grand Cordons (Imperial Family) of the Order of the Precious Crown
19th-century Japanese people
19th-century Japanese women
20th-century Japanese people
20th-century Japanese women
People from Tokyo
Daughters of emperors